Colotis guenei is a butterfly in the family Pieridae. It is found on Madagascar. The habitat consists of forests.

References

Butterflies described in 1877
guenei
Butterflies of Africa
Taxa named by Paul Mabille